FK Sirijus Klaipėda was a Lithuanian football club, played in the Žalgiris Stadium in Klaipėda. The club won the Lithuanian Championship in 1990, and twice won the Lithuanian Football Cup: in 1988 and 1990.

Founded in 1973 as Syrius Klaipėda the club was renamed in 1989 to FK Sirijus Klaipėda. In 1996 the club was dissolved.

Season-by-season

 Lithuania
{|class="wikitable"
|-bgcolor="#efefef"
! Season
! Div.
! Pos.
! Pl.
! W
! D
! L
! Goals
! P
! Top Scorer
!Cup
!colspan=2|Europe
|-
|align=center|1991
|align=center|1st
|align=center bg=silver|5
|align=center|14
|align=center|8
|align=center|4
|align=center|2
|align=center|24–10
|align=center|20
|align=center|
|align=center|
|align=center|
|align=left|
|}

Achievements
Lithuanian Championship: 1
 1990
Lithuanian Cup: 2
 1988, 1990

References
weltfussballarchiv 

 
Defunct football clubs in Lithuania
Association football clubs established in 1973
Association football clubs disestablished in 1996
Football clubs in Klaipėda
1973 establishments in Lithuania
1996 disestablishments in Lithuania